Musiol is a surname. Notable people with the surname include:

Bogdan Musioł (born 1957), Polish-born East German and German bobsledder
Daniel Musiol (born 1983), German cyclist
Joseph Musiol (1865–?), Silesian politician
Julian Musiol (born 1986), German ski jumper
Marie-Jeanne Musiol (born 1950), Canadian photographer
Zbyněk Musiol (born 1991), Czech footballer

See also
 
Musiał, surname
Musil, surname

Polish-language surnames